is a Japanese baseball player for the CITYLIGHT OKAYAMA. He has played for the Tokyo Yakult Swallows of Nippon Professional Baseball (NPB).

On December 2, 2020, he become free agent.

References

External links

 NPB.com

1988 births
Living people
Baseball people from Hyōgo Prefecture
Japanese baseball players
Nippon Professional Baseball catchers
Tokyo Yakult Swallows players